Triplophysa flavicorpus is a species of stone loach in the genus Triplophysa endemic to the Hongshui River in Guangxi, China. It grows to  SL.

References

F
Freshwater fish of China
Endemic fauna of Guangxi
Fish described in 2004